Clathrina dictyoides is a species of calcareous sponge from Australia. This species is considered to be dubious because the type, and only known specimen, is lost.

References

World Register of Marine Species entry

Clathrina
Sponges of Australia
Sponges described in 1872
Taxa named by Ernst Haeckel